The Bayer designation Kappa Sagittarii (κ Sagittarii) is shared by two star systems, κ1 Sagittarii and κ2 Sagittarii, in the constellation Sagittarius.  The two star systems are separated by 0.46° in the sky.

 κ1 Sagittarii
 κ2 Sagittarii

Sagittarii, Kappa
Sagittarius (constellation)